Oral microbiology is the study of the microorganisms (microbiota) of the oral cavity and their interactions between oral microorganisms or with the host.  The environment present in the human mouth is suited to the growth of characteristic microorganisms found there. It provides a source of water and nutrients, as well as a moderate temperature.  Resident microbes of the mouth adhere to the teeth and gums to resist mechanical flushing from the mouth to stomach where acid-sensitive microbes are destroyed by hydrochloric acid.

Anaerobic bacteria in the oral cavity include: Actinomyces, Arachnia (Propionibacterium propionicus), Bacteroides, Bifidobacterium, Eubacterium, Fusobacterium, Lactobacillus, Leptotrichia, Peptococcus, Peptostreptococcus, Propionibacterium, Selenomonas, Treponema, and Veillonella. The most commonly found protists are Entamoeba gingivalis and Trichomonas tenax. Genera of fungi that are frequently found in the mouth include Candida, Cladosporium, Aspergillus, Fusarium, Glomus, Alternaria, Penicillium, and Cryptococcus, among others.   Bacteria accumulate on both the hard and soft oral tissues in biofilms. Bacterial adhesion is particularly important for oral bacteria.

Oral bacteria have evolved mechanisms to sense their environment and evade or modify the host. Bacteria occupy the ecological niche provided by both the tooth surface and mucosal epithelium.  Factors of note that have been found to affect the microbial colonization of the oral cavity include the pH, oxygen concentration and its availability at specific oral surfaces, mechanical forces acting upon oral surfaces, salivary and fluid flow through the oral cavity, and age. However, a highly efficient innate host defense system constantly monitors the bacterial colonization and prevents bacterial invasion of local tissues. A dynamic equilibrium exists between dental plaque bacteria and the innate host defense system.  Of particular interest is the role of oral microorganisms in the two major dental diseases: dental caries and periodontal disease.  Additionally, research has correlated poor oral heath and the resulting ability of the oral microbiota to invade the body to affect cardiac health as well as cognitive function.

Oral microflora

The oral microbiome, mainly comprising bacteria which have developed resistance to the human immune system, has been known to impact the host for its own benefit, as seen with dental cavities. The environment present in the human mouth allows the growth of characteristic microorganisms found there. It provides a source of water and nutrients, as well as a moderate temperature. Resident microbes of the mouth adhere to the teeth and gums to resist mechanical flushing from the mouth to stomach where acid-sensitive microbes are destroyed by hydrochloric acid.

Anaerobic bacteria in the oral cavity include: Actinomyces, Arachnia, Bacteroides, Bifidobacterium, Eubacterium, Fusobacterium, Lactobacillus, Leptotrichia, Peptococcus, Peptostreptococcus, Propionibacterium, Selenomonas, Treponema, and Veillonella. In addition, there are also a number of fungi found in the oral cavity, including: Candida, Cladosporium, Aspergillus, Fusarium, Glomus, Alternaria, Penicillium, and Cryptococcus. The oral cavity of a new-born baby does not contain bacteria but rapidly becomes colonized with bacteria such as Streptococcus salivarius. With the appearance of the teeth during the first year colonization by Streptococcus mutans and Streptococcus sanguinis occurs as these organisms colonise the dental surface and gingiva. Other strains of streptococci adhere strongly to the gums and cheeks but not to the teeth. The gingival crevice area (supporting structures of the teeth) provides a habitat for a variety of anaerobic species. Bacteroides and spirochetes colonize the mouth around puberty. Of particular interest is the role of oral microorganisms in the two major dental diseases: dental caries and periodontal disease.

Ecological sites for oral microbiota 
As a diverse environment, a variety of organisms are able to inhabit unique ecological niches present in the oral cavity including the teeth, gingiva, tongue, cheeks, and palates.

Dental plaque 
The dental plaque is made up of the microbial community that is adhered to the tooth surface; this plaque is also recognized as a biofilm. While it is said that this plaque is adhered to the tooth surface, the microbial community of the plaque is not directly in contact with the enamel of the tooth. Instead, bacteria with the ability to form attachments to the acquired pellicle, which contains certain salivary proteins, on the surface of the teeth, begin the establishment of the biofilm. yes. Upon dental plaque maturation, in which the microbial community grows and diversifies, the plaque is covered in an interbacterial matrix.

Dental calculus 
The calculus of the oral cavity is the result of mineralization of and around dead microorganisms; this calculus can then be colonized by living bacteria. Dental calculus can be present on supragingival and subgingival surfaces.

Oral mucosa 
The mucosa of the oral cavity provides a unique ecological site for microbiota to inhabit. Unlike the teeth, the mucosa of the oral cavity is frequently shedding and thus its microbial inhabitants are both kept at lower relative abundance than those of the teeth but also must be able to overcome the obstacle of the shedding epithelia.

Tongue 
Unlike other mucosal surfaces of the oral cavity, the nature of the top surface of the tongue, due in part to the presence of numerous papillae, provides a unique ecological niche for its microbial inhabits. One important characteristic of this habitat is that the spaces between the papillae tend to not receive much, if any, oxygenated saliva, which creates an environment suitable for microaerophilic and obligate anaerobic microbiota.

Acquisition of oral microbiota 
Acquisition of the oral microbiota heavily depends on the route of delivery as an infant - vaginal versus caesarian; upon comparing infants three months after birth, infants born vaginally were reported to have higher oral taxonomic diversity than their cesarean born counterparts. Further acquisition is determined by diet, developmental accomplishments, general lifestyle habits, hygiene, and the use of antibiotics. Breastfed infants are noted to have higher oral lactobacilli colonization than their formula-fed counterparts. Diversity of the oral microbiome is also shown to flourish upon the eruption of primary teeth and later adult teeth, as new ecological niches are introduced to the oral cavity.

Factors of microbial colonization 
Saliva plays a considerable role in influencing the oral microbiome. More than 800 species of bacteria colonize oral mucous, 1,300 species are found in the gingival crevice, and nearly 1,000 species comprise dental plaque. The mouth is a rich environment for hundreds of species of bacteria since saliva is mostly water and plenty of nutrients pass through the mouth each day. When kissing, it takes only 10 seconds for no less than 80 million bacteria to be exchanged by the passing of saliva. However, the effect is transitory, as each individual quickly returns to their own equilibrium.

Thanks to progress in molecular biology techniques, scientific understanding of oral ecology is improving. Oral ecology is being more comprehensively mapped, including the tongue, the teeth, the gums, salivary glands, etc. which are home to these communities of different microorganisms.

The host's immune system controls the bacterial colonization of the mouth and prevents local infection of tissues. A dynamic equilibrium exists notably between the bacteria of dental plaque and the host's immune system, enabling the plaque to stay behind in the mouth when other biofilms are washed away.

In equilibrium, the bacterial biofilm produced by the fermentation of sugar in the mouth is quickly swept away by the saliva, except for dental plaque. In cases of imbalance in the equilibrium, oral microorganisms grow out of control and cause oral diseases such as tooth decay and periodontal disease. Several studies have also linked poor oral hygiene to infection by pathogenic bacteria.

Role in health 
There are many factors of oral health which need to be preserved in order to prevent pathogenesis of the oral microbiome or diseases of the mouth. Dental plaque is the material that adheres to the teeth and consists of bacterial cells (mainly S. mutans and S. sanguis), salivary polymers and bacterial extracellular products. Plaque is a biofilm on the surfaces of the teeth. This accumulation of microorganisms subject the teeth and gingival tissues to high concentrations of bacterial metabolites which results in dental disease. If not taken care of, via brushing or flossing, the plaque can turn into tartar (its hardened form) and lead to gingivitis or periodontal disease. In the case of dental cavities, proteins involved in colonization of teeth by Streptococcus mutans can produce antibodies that inhibit the cariogenic process which can be used to create vaccines. Bacteria species typically associated with the oral microbiota have been found to be present in women with bacterial vaginosis. Genera of fungi that are frequently found in the mouth include Candida, Cladosporium, Aspergillus, Fusarium, Glomus, Alternaria, Penicillium, and Cryptococcus, among others. Additionally, research has correlated poor oral heath and the resulting ability of the oral microbiota to invade the body to affect cardiac health as well as cognitive function.  High levels of circulating antibodies to oral pathogens Campylobacter rectus, Veillonella parvula and Prevotella melaninogenica are associated with hypertension in human.

Importance of dental hygiene 

Maintaining a balanced oral microflora is important for total wellness. The best way to maintain this environment is with proper oral hygiene. Insufficient brushing and flossing can lead to gum and tooth disease, and eventually tooth loss. In addition, poor dental hygiene has been linked to conditions such as osteoporosis, diabetes and cardiovascular diseases. Some diseases and medications are known to limit salivary flow, making it easier for bacteria to overgrow in the mouth without being washed away. To prevent any possible side effects from poor oral hygiene, it is important to brush and floss every day, schedule regular cleanings, eat a healthy diet and use a recently replaced toothbrush.

Issues and areas of research 
The oral environment (temperature, humidity, pH, nutrients, etc.) impacts the selection of adapted (and sometimes pathogenic) populations of microorganisms. For a young person or an adult in good health and with a healthy diet, the microbes living in the mouth adhere to mucous, teeth and gums to resist removal by saliva. Eventually, they are mostly washed away and destroyed during their trip through the stomach. Salivary flow and oral conditions vary person-to-person, and also relative to the time of day and whether or not an individual sleeps with their mouth open. From youth to old age, the entire mouth interacts with and affects the oral microbiome. Via the larynx, numerous bacteria can travel through the respiratory tract to the lungs. There, mucous is charged with their removal. Pathogenic oral microflora have been linked to the production of factors which favor autoimmune diseases such as psoriasis and arthritis, as well as cancers of the colon, lungs and breasts.

Intercellular communication 
Most of the bacterial species found in the mouth belong to microbial communities, called biofilms, a feature of which is inter-bacterial communication. Cell–cell contact is mediated by specific protein adhesins and often, as in the case of inter-species aggregation, by complementary polysaccharide receptors. Another method of communication involves cell–cell signalling molecules, which are of two classes: those used for intra-species and those used for inter-species signalling. An example of intra-species communication is quorum sensing. Oral bacteria have been shown to produce small peptides, such as competence stimulating peptides, which can help promote single-species biofilm formation. A common form of inter-species signalling is mediated by 4, 5-dihydroxy-2, 3-pentanedione (DPD), also known as autoinducer-2 (Al-2).

See also 

 Biofilms
 Dental plaque
 Environmental microbiology
 Human microbiota
 Human Microbiome Project
 Microbiology
 Theodor Rosebury
 List of bacterial vaginosis microbiota

References

External links 
 Human Oral Microbiome Database (HOMD)

Microbiology
Dentistry branches
Microbiomes